Chathamiidae is a family of case making caddisflies more commonly known as the marine caddisflies. Chathamiids are unique among insects in their invasion of the tide pool environment. Larvae construct their cases of coralline algae. The four described species are distributed along the coasts of New Zealand, New South Wales, and the Chatham Islands.

References 

Trichoptera families
Integripalpia